The 1998 Georgia Bulldogs football team represented the University of Georgia during the 1998 NCAA Division I-A football season. The Bulldogs completed the season with a 9–3 record.

Schedule

Rankings

Roster

References

Georgia
Georgia Bulldogs football seasons
Peach Bowl champion seasons
Georgia Bulldogs football